Navan is a community in Orléans South-Navan Ward in Ottawa, Ontario, Canada. It is located southeast of the suburban community of Orleans. Before its amalgamation with the city in 2001, Navan was within the City of Cumberland. It was named after the town of Navan in Ireland.

Navan is about 20 km east of the city of Ottawa and the centre of the town is Colonial Road (Ottawa Road #28) and Trim Road

Navan's proximity to the suburban area of Orleans means that it is quickly becoming more suburban in nature itself. About 1,905 people live in the vicinity of Navan (Canada 2016 Census).

The Navan Fair is an annual event that takes place in August. It is held in the fairground off Colonial Road. The fair features midway rides, live music, concession stands, demolition derbies, exhibitions, a parade, and various shows. The first fair took place in 1946. The admission for the first year of the fair was 35 cents for adults, 25 cents for children, and 25 cents for cars.

Notable landmarks
 JT Bradley’s, general store originally built in 1898 but rebuilt in 1949 after it burned down in 1948.
 Navan Memorial Centre and Arena, built in 1955, and completely rebuilt in 1982 after the 1955 arena was condemned.
 OC Transpo Park and Ride (at Memorial Centre) 
 Navan Curling Club, opened in 1990.
 Heritage Public School, officially opened on September 5, 2006 to replace Meadowview Public School, which closed down in 2004.
 The Shaw House, located on the northwest corner of Trim Road and Smith Road, is a historic house built in 1876.
 The Domes, installed in the fairgrounds, originally used for the Papal Mass when Pope John Paul II visited Canada. 
 St Mary's Anglican church constructed of local limestone and completed in 1898
 Navan Vars United Church dedicated in 1926

Notable people from Navan
 Genevieve Thauvette, a notable creative photographer, is a native of Navan.
 Érik Bédard, a professional baseball player, is also a native of Navan.

Transit in Navan

OC Transpo
 OC Transpo route 228 Albert and Bay (Weekdays only at 6:00, 6:28, 7:11) 
 OC Transpo route 228 Sarsfield (Weekdays only at 16:25, 17:03, 18:00) 
 OC Transpo route 302 Orleans (Tuesdays only at 9:15 to Orleans)(free)
 OC Transpo route 302 Cumberland (Tuesdays only at 15:08 to Cumberland)(free)

References 

http://www.octranspo.com/routes?lang=en&date=20160517&rte=231
http://www.octranspo.com/routes?lang=en&date=20160517&rte=202
http://www.octranspo.com/routes/rural_park_ride
https://www.google.ca/maps/place/Navan,+Ottawa,+ON/@45.4238304,-75.4271915,15z/data=!4m5!3m4!1s0x4cce72f733df10b5:0xab6bb76081e6b784!8m2!3d45.421034!4d-75.4267251?hl=en
http://www.progressivewaste.com/en/locations/navan-waste-recycling-and-disposal-facility
http://ottawa.ca/en/residents/garbage-and-recycling/garbage-collection/collection-calendar
http://www.carlsbadsprings.ca/?page_id=480

Neighbourhoods in Ottawa